The Xiaodongying Mosque is a mosque in Yuexiu District, Guangzhou City, Guangdong Province, China.

History
The mosque was originally constructed during Chenghua Emperor of Ming Dynasty. It was renovated twice during Qing Dynasty.

Architecture

Transportation
The mosque is accessible within walking distance northeast of Gongyuanqian Station of Guangzhou Metro.

See also
 Islam in China
 List of mosques in China

References

Mosques in China
Religious buildings and structures in Guangzhou
Yuexiu District